Yowrqanlu-ye Janizeh (also Romanized as Yowrqānlū-ye Janīzeh; also known as Yowrqānlū) is a village in Nazluchay Rural District, Nazlu District, Urmia County, West Azerbaijan Province, Iran. At the 2006 census, its population was 114, in 25 families.

References 

Populated places in Urmia County